"Ácido Sabor" is a song recorded by Puerto Rican singer Ricky Martin for Martin's second extended play, Play (2022). The song was written by Freddy Montalvo, Martin, José Carlos Cruz, Isaac Ortiz Geronimo, and Sébastien Julien Alfred, while the production was handled by Subelo NEO. It was released to Latin American radio stations by Sony Music Latin on July 15, 2020, as the only promotional single from the EP. A Spanish language pop ballad with elements of flamenco and urban pop, it is a romantic song "filled with many contradictions like life" that "represents finding love" and the singer himself.

"Ácido Sabor" received widely positive reviews from music critics, who complimented its rhythm and "heartfelt" lyrics. The accompanying music video was directed by Carlos Perez. It depicts Martin as a bullfighter and contains several religious references.

Background and release
Ricky Martin started recording his eleventh studio album, initially titled Movimiento, in the  second half of 2019, inspired by the 2019 political protests in Puerto Rico. While, because of the COVID-19 pandemic and subsequent personal experiences, Martin decided to split the album Movimiento into the two EPs Pausa and Play. He released Pausa in May 2020. "Ácido Sabor" was included as the first track on his second EP Play, released July 13, 2022. Following Martin's meeting with the production team SubeloNEO in April 2022, which led to a studio session to compose "Ácido Sabor", it became the last track that he recorded for the EP. During an interview with Billboard, the singer explained:

Sony Music Latin released "Ácido Sabor" to Latin American radio stations on July 15, 2022, as the only promotional single from Play. An "Orbital Audio" version of the song was included as the first track on the Orbital Audio version of the EP, released simultaneously with the original.

Music and lyrics

Musically, "Ácido Sabor" is a Spanish language pop ballad with elements of flamenco and urban pop, that uses acoustic guitar. It was written by Freddy Montalvo, Martin, José Carlos Cruz, Isaac Ortiz Geronimo, and Sébastien Julien Alfred. The production was handled by Subelo NEO, and the track runs for a total of 3 minutes and 30 seconds. Lyrically, "Ácido Sabor", which translates to "Sour Taste" in English, is a romantic song "filled with many contradictions like life" that "represents finding love" and the singer himself, with lyrics including, "Peligroso / Tal vez todo se sienta dulce, pero es doloroso / Agarro tu mano, camino y me siento grandioso / No tengo alas / Pero tú me haces volar, eh" (Dangerous / It may all feel sweet, but it's painful / I hold your hand, I walk and I feel great / I don't have wings / But you make me fly, huh).

Critical reception
Upon release, "Ácido Sabor" was met with widely positive reviews from music critics. Jessica Roiz from Billboard described the song as a "very heartfelt track" with an "innovative rhythm". Also from Billboard, Griselda Flores highlighted it among the "pop gems" of Play. An author of Marca called the song "[a] hit", while Latinas Lucas Villa labeled it "seriously sexy". A writer of Happyfm gave "Ácido Sabor" a positive review, describing it as an "amazing song", commenting that Martin "has always shown to have enormous talent" and "always knows how to leave us speechless".

Music video

On June 27, 2022, Martin shared a photo of himself in action, revealing that it would be for his next music video, with the caption: "In this photo, a little tease of what the video of my next single is going feel like." Almost two weeks later, on July 13, he announced that the video for "Ácido Sabor" would be released "soon". The music video was released on July 14, 2022. It was directed by Carlos Perez, who had previously directed the videos for Martin's singles "Tal Vez", "Jaleo", "The Best Thing About Me Is You", "Frío", "Come with Me", "Perdóname", "Fiebre", "Falta Amor", "Tiburones (Remix)", "Recuerdo", and "Canción Bonita. Martin portrays a bullfighter in the visual, which contains some religious references and bullfighting. It depicts Martin in a confessional that seems to be inside a temple. In other parts of the video, he is shown in a symbolic battle against himself. A phrase appears in the end of the video: "La incertidumbre de un conflicto se desvanece con el poder de la integridad" (The uncertainty of a conflict it vanishes with the power of integrity). The music video was nominated for Favorite Video at the 2022 Buenos Aires Music Video Festival.

Credits and personnel
Credits adapted from Tidal.

 Ricky Martin vocal, composer, lyricist, associated performer
 Subelo NEO producer
 Freddy Montalvo composer, lyricist, recording engineer
 José Carlos Cruz composer, lyricist, recording engineer
 Isaac Ortiz Geronimo composer, lyricist
 Sébastien Julien Alfred composer, lyricist
 Jaycen Joshua mastering engineer, mixing engineer
 Jean Rodríguez recording engineer, vocal producer
 Gaby Vilar A&R coordinator
 Izzy De Jesús A&R director

Charts

Weekly charts

Year-end charts

Release history

References

2020s ballads
2022 songs
2022 singles
Pop ballads
Ricky Martin songs
Songs written by Ricky Martin
Sony Music Latin singles
Spanish-language songs